Douglas Churchill (born 7 November 1948) is an Australian judoka. He competed in the men's half-middleweight event at the 1972 Summer Olympics.

References

External links
 

1948 births
Living people
Australian male judoka
Olympic judoka of Australia
Judoka at the 1972 Summer Olympics
Place of birth missing (living people)